The Glover Webb Hornet is a light assault vehicle based on the Land Rover Defender 4x4 vehicle. It was built by the United Kingdom-based company Glover Webb Limited.

Design

The vehicle specifications are the same as the Land Rover Defender where the engine is in the front and the driver and commander are in the middle. Its powered by V8 petrol engine or a turbocharged diesel engine. For the armament, Glover Webb Hornet armed with one 12.7mm machine gun on the top of the roof and one 7.62mm machine gun at the commander seat. Both machine guns are manually operates by one soldier each. This vehicle also equipped with smoke grenade dischargers as self defence protection.

References

Military light utility vehicles
Military vehicles of the United Kingdom
Off-road vehicles